Medical/Market Center station is a Trinity Railway Express commuter rail station in Dallas, Texas. It is located at Motor Street and Medical Center Drive along the Stemmons Corridor (Interstate 35E) in North Dallas. It opened on December 30, 1996, and serves Dallas Market Center and the nearby medical district which includes Parkland Memorial Hospital, Children's Medical Center of Dallas, University of Texas Southwestern Medical Center, William P. Clements Jr. University Hospital and Zale Lipshy Pavilion – William P. Clements Jr. University Hospital.

References

External links 
 TRE - Medical/Market Center Station
 Dallas Area Rapid Transit

Dallas Area Rapid Transit commuter rail stations
Railway stations in the United States opened in 1996
Trinity Railway Express stations
Railway stations in Dallas
Railway stations in Dallas County, Texas